Agios Minas is a former municipality on the island of Chios, North Aegean, Greece. Since the 2011 local government reform it is part of the municipality Chios, of which it is a municipal unit. It is located on the central east coast of the island, just south of Chios (town). Its land area is 13.049 km². Its population was 3,271 at the 2011 census. The seat of the municipality was in Thymiana (pop. 1,566). Its next largest town is Neochori (587).

References

Populated places in Chios

bg:Агиос Минас (дем)